Spisko-Gubałowski Highlands (Pogórze Spisko-Gubałowskie, Polish) (514.13) - a mesoregion, the southern and highest part of the Podhale-Magura Depression, its north defined by the Pieniny Klippen Belt, the east of which carries on from the Pieniny. The southern side of the Spisko-Gubałowski Highlands is defined by the decline of the Podtatrzański Trench.

Topography

Distinguishable topographical features of the Spisko-Gubałowski Highlands are as follows:

Skoruszyńskie Highlands. Divided into three subregions: 
Orava Highlands
Skoruszyńskie Summits
Orava-Wit Summits
Gubałowski Highlands
Bukowiński Highlands
Spisz Highlands

See also
Zakopane
Tatra Mountains

References

Regions of Poland